Astapenko Glacier is a glacier,  long, draining the north and northeast slopes of Stanwix Peak in the Bowers Mountains and flowing east-northeast to Ob' Bay, situated in Victoria Land, Antarctica. It was mapped by the United States Geological Survey from surveys and from U.S. Navy air photos, 1960–62, and named by the Advisory Committee on Antarctic Names for Pavel D. Astapenko, Soviet IGY observer, a Weather Central meteorologist at Little America V in 1958. The glacier lies on the Pennell Coast, a portion of Antarctica lying between Cape Williams and Cape Adare.

See also
 List of glaciers in the Antarctic
 Glaciology

References
 

Glaciers of Pennell Coast